MMEA is a common abbreviation and may refer to:

Maryland Music Educators Association
Minnesota Music Educators Association
Malaysian Maritime Enforcement Agency